is a railway station in Yodogawa-ku, Osaka, Japan. It is the western terminus of the high-speed Tōkaidō Shinkansen line from Tokyo, the eastern terminus of the San'yō Shinkansen and one of Osaka's main railway terminals to the north. The Shinkansen lines are physically joined, and many trains offer through service.

Shin-Osaka is about 3 km from the older Ōsaka Station. The new station was built in 1964 to avoid the engineering difficulties of running Shinkansen lines into the center of the city. The JR Kyoto Line and subway Midōsuji Line provide convenient connections to other stations around the city center.

Lines
JR Kyoto Line (Tōkaidō Main Line, West Japan Railway Company (JR West))
San'yō Shinkansen (JR West)
Osaka Higashi Line (JR West)
Tōkaidō Shinkansen (Central Japan Railway Company (JR Central))
Osaka Municipal Subway Midōsuji Line (M13)

JR

Station layout

The JR station consists of five island platforms serving ten tracks for JR West Lines at ground level, with two side platforms and three island platforms serving eight Shinkansen tracks operated by JR Central located on the fourth level, over the platforms and tracks for the JR West Lines in the east. There was a space on the east side of former Track 10 from the opening of the station, where another platform serving current Tracks 9 and 10 is located, and the existing services shifted eastward one platform at a time (and renovations performed on each newly vacated platform), with the westernmost platform used by services on the Osaka Higashi Line, was commenced by the 16 March 2019. On the northern side of the station, an additional eastbound Shinkansen platform, Track 27, was opened on 16 March 2013. (This northern area was originally reserved for a connection from Awaji Station and Jūsō Station by Hankyu Railway, but these plans were later cancelled and the space unused).

Limited express trains
for the Hokuriku Main Line
 Thunderbird: Osaka - , 
for the Tōkaidō Line, and the Takayama Line
 Hida: Osaka - , 
 Biwako Express: Osaka - 
for the Hanwa Line, the Kansai Airport Line, and the Kinokuni Line
 Haruka: Maibara, Kyoto - 
 Kuroshio: Kyoto, Shin-Osaka - , 
for the Fukuchiyama Line
for the Sanin region via the Chizu Express Chizu Line
 Super Hakuto: Kyoto - ,

Adjacent stations

Osaka Metro

Station layout
This station has one island platform with two tracks on the third level, located to the west of the platforms and tracks for the Shinkansen.

Surrounding area

Inside the station
Nippon Travel Agency TiS Shin-Osaka
JR Tokai Tours Shin-Osaka Branch
Osaka Prefectural Police, Railway Police Force Shin-Osaka
Osaka Noren Meguri restaurant (in the paid area for the Shinkansen)

North
Shin-Osaka Hankyu Building
Mielparque Osaka
Hotel La Foret Osaka
Via Inn Shin-Osaka West
Konami Sports Club

South
Nissin Foods
Shin-Osaka Washington Hotel Plaza
Osaka Prefectural Police, Railway Police Force Headquarters

East (Hinode Side)
Shin-Osaka Youth Hostel
Shin-Osaka Station Hotel
Life Corporation

See also
 List of railway stations in Japan

Notes

References

Osaka Metro stations
Railway stations in Osaka
Sanyō Shinkansen
Tōkaidō Shinkansen
Tōkaidō Main Line
Railway stations in Japan opened in 1964
Railway stations in Japan opened in 2019